Chevrolet is an unincorporated community in  Harlan County, Kentucky, United States.

History
A post office called Chevrolet was established in 1918, and remained in operation until 1992. The community was named after the Chevrolet Series 490, the first car seen on local roads.

A 1935 newspaper account reported the town had 800 inhabitants, and about 60 cars, 30 of which were Chevrolets.

References

Unincorporated communities in Harlan County, Kentucky
Unincorporated communities in Kentucky
Coal towns in Kentucky